Die Beautiful is a Filipino LGBT comedy-drama film directed by Jun Robles Lana and produced by Jun Robles Lana, Ferdinand Lapuz and Perci M. Intalan, from a story by Jun Lana and screenplay by Rody Vera. It stars Paolo Ballesteros as Trisha, a trans woman who suddenly died after she was crowned winner of a gay beauty pageant and her friends who transform her into a different person on each night of her wake in a different location as a way to avoid being buried as a man by her father. It also tackles her whole life when she felt and dealt with problems and successes on living as a Filipina transgender as well as controversy in her family.

The film had its premiere at the 29th Tokyo International Film Festival on October 27, 2016, in Tokyo, Japan and it became an official entry to the 2016 Metro Manila Film Festival.

Plot
Trisha Echevarria (Paolo Ballesteros), is a transgender woman whose sexuality is greatly opposed by her father (Joel Torre), causing her to leave their house and live with her best friend Barbs (Christian Bables).

At present, Trisha is already dead. She died when she was newly crowned as Binibining Gay Pilipinas. Everyday in her wake, Trisha undergoes makeup transformations into different female celebrities, which she owes to the makeup skills of Barbs. The best friends enjoyed doing makeup transformations together when Trisha was still alive.

Iza Calzado, who crowned Trisha in Binibining Gay Pilipinas, visits the wake at the time when Trisha's makeup transformation is Iza's face. During Trisha's transformation as Miley Cyrus, the funeral parlor owner Flora (Lou Veloso) takes a selfie with her and uploads it online. The photo goes viral, making Trisha's wake an attraction even for people who do not know her, much to Barbs' disapproval. Couturier Eugene Domingo also visits the wake and brings a white gown for Trisha to wear during her transformation as Julia Roberts from the Runaway Bride.

Flashbacks of Trisha's life were shown. Teenage Trisha, who was still Patrick then, studying in the same school with Barbs. Patrick has a crush on basketball player Migs (Albie Casiño) and goes out with him one night after Barbs' encouraging. He gets gang-raped by a drunk Migs and his friends, causing an anal bleeding. Patrick's father, with his sister Beth (Gladys Reyes), visits him in the hospital and finds out about what happened, slapping him.

The relationship of Patrick and his father is further strained as Patrick secretly joins gay beauty contests. Eventually, his dad disowns him. As he exits their house, Patrick announces his new identity: Trisha Echeverria.

Barbs and his mother let Trisha stay with them. Trisha adopts an orphaned child named Adora and renames her as Shirley Mae. Not having jobs, Trisha and Barbs continue to join pageants. Trisha usually loses because of failing the question and answer portion. She then gets breast implants, thinking that it will help her win pageants.

Trisha dates a young gay club dancer named Miko. She even pays for Miko's rhinoplasty but their relationship is short-lived as she finds out that Miko is having an affair with a gay beauty parlor owner (Mel Martinez).

Trisha meets Jesse (Luis Alandy) at a bar. Although Jesse is married, they start dating. On their sixth monthsary, Jesse fails to arrive. A month after, Jesse's wife Diana invites Trisha to a hospital where Jesse was confined due to leukemia. Jesse informs Trisha about his condition and confesses that their meeting was not accidental. Jesse was urged by his conscience as he was one of Migs' friends involved in the gang rape. Although he tells Trisha that he grew to love her, Trisha is distraught and leaves.

Trisha joins Binibining Gay Pilipinas and picks a question she has encountered before. She delivers her memorized answer well "..if I'll die and be blessed to live again, I would choose to be nobody, nobody but me." At the backstage, Trisha jokingly tells Barbs that if she wins the pageant, she will be ready to die. She further elaborates the details of her funeral: to have a makeover as different celebrities every day. Trisha finally wins but shortly dies of cerebral aneurysm.

In the morgue, Trisha's father and sister arrive. Her father orders to have Trisha's breast implants removed. Beth disagrees. Their father ends up having Trisha dressed in a Barong tagalog. Barbs, Paola, and Erica get disappointed at the sight of their friend and asks for Beth's help to sneak out Trisha's corpse and give her the burial she wished for.

In the last day of her wake, Barbs announces that the final makeover of Trisha is what she really is: the Trisha they knew who lived a glamorous life. The movie ends with Trisha's final walk message, showing a younger version of herself.

Other celebrity transformations of Trisha during her wake are Angelina Jolie, Lady Gaga, and Beyonce.

Cast

Main cast
 Paolo Ballesteros as Trisha Echevarria / Patrick
 Christian Bables as Barbs

Supporting cast
 Joel Torre as Papa
 Gladys Reyes as Beth
 Luis Alandy as Jesse
 Albie Casiño as Migs
 Faye Alhambra as Shirley Mae
Inah de Belen as teen Shirley Mae
 IC Mendoza as Paola
 Cedrick Juan as Erika
 Lou Veloso as Flora
 Mimi Juareza as Mommy

Guest cast
 Iza Calzado as herself
 Eugene Domingo as herself
 Mel Martinez as gay parlor owner
 Jade Lopez as Diana
 Adrianna So
 Kokoy de Santos as Michael Angelo

Production
Die Beautiful is a film funded by Hong Kong – Asia Financing Forum and produced by Regal Entertainment, The IdeaFirst Company, and Octobertrain Films. The film was directed by Jun Robles Lana and produced by Lily Monteverde, Roselle Monteverde and Perci Intalan.

Release
Die Beautiful was selected in the Main Competition of the Tokyo International Film Festival, which ran from October 25, 2016, to November 3, 2016.

The film is an official entry to the 2016 Metro Manila Film Festival, and was screened at the 2017 Luang Prabang Film Festival.

Reception 
At the awarding ceremony at the Tokyo International Film Festival which was held on November 3, 2016, at the Toho Cinemas in Roppongi Hills in Japan, Paolo Ballesteros was named the festival's Best Actor. The film also won the Audience Choice Award.

The jury was headed by French director Jean-Jacques Beineix, and included Hong Kong director Mabel Cheung, U.S. producer Nicole Rocklin, Italian actor Valerio Mastandrea and Japanese director Hideyuki Hirayama.

A total of 16 films, with Die Beautiful being the only one from the Philippines, were in competition.

Sequel 
It was announced that a sequel was in production to be a 12-part spin-off television series to be aired on Cignal Play entitled Born Beautiful with Paolo Ballesteros reprising his role and Martin del Rosario picking up the role of Barbs which was originally portrayed by Christian Bables. Instead, the producers decided to make it into a full-length film with majority of the story focusing on Barbs.

Awards and nominations

References

External links
 

2016 films
2016 LGBT-related films
Philippine comedy-drama films
Philippine LGBT-related films
Films about trans women
Films about families
Films about death
Philippine New Wave
Regal Entertainment films
Films directed by Jun Robles Lana